Porthecla annette is a butterfly in the family Lycaenidae. It is found in Panama and central Colombia at altitudes under 1,000 meters.

The length of the forewings is 14.2 mm for males and 15 mm for females.

Etymology
The species is named for Dr. Annette Aiello, a scientist at the Smithsonian Tropical Research Institute, who has contributed immensely to the knowledge of the Central American insect fauna.

References

Butterflies described in 2011
Eumaeini